Leon DeMontreville (September 23, 1874 – March 22, 1962) was a professional baseball player. Primarily a shortstop, DeMontreville spent one season in the major leagues, with the St. Louis Cardinals in 1903. He appeared in 26 games and batted 82 times, posting a .243 batting average and collecting three stolen bases.

DeMontreville's older brother Gene DeMontreville was also a Major League Baseball player.

References

External links

1874 births
1962 deaths
St. Louis Cardinals players
Major League Baseball shortstops
Baseball players from Minnesota
Minor league baseball managers
Fort Wayne Indians players
Saginaw Salt Eaters players
Syracuse Stars (minor league baseball) players
Rochester Bronchos players
Lawrence Colts players
Haverhill Hustlers players
Indianapolis Indians players
Fargo (minor league baseball) players
Charleston Sea Gulls players
People from Washington County, Minnesota
People from Pelham Manor, New York
Kansas City Blue Stockings players
Addison White Sox players